Kuniesaurus albiauris is a species of skink endemic to New Caledonia. It is the only species in the monotypic genus Kuniesaurus.

Kuniesaurus albiauris is only known from a small patch of dense coastal forest with limestone substrate on the Isle of Pines. Due to its very small and restricted habitat, it is highly threatened by invasive species such as the little fire ant. It has been proposed that Kuniesaurus be classified as Critically Endangered on the IUCN Red List.

References 

Skinks
Monotypic lizard genera
Reptiles of New Caledonia
Endemic fauna of New Caledonia
Taxa named by Aaron M. Bauer
Taxa named by Matthias Deuss
Taxa named by Ross Allen Sadlier